Ronner is a surname. Notable people with the surname include:

Alfred Ronner (1851–1901), Belgian painter, graphic artist, and illustrator
Alice Ronner (1857–1957), Belgian painter, sister of Alfred

See also
Henriëtte Ronner-Knip (1821–1909), Dutch-Belgian artist